The twenty-seventh edition of the Caribbean Series (Serie del Caribe) of baseball was played in . It was held from February 2 through February 7 with the champion teams from Dominican Republic (Tigres del Licey), Mexico (Tomateros de Culiacán), Puerto Rico (Metropolitanos de San Juan) and Venezuela (Tiburones de la Guaira). The format consisted of 12 games, each team facing the other teams twice. The games were played at Estadio Teodoro Mariscal  in Mazatlán, Mexico.

Summary
The Dominican Republic team won the Series with a 5-1 record and was managed by Terry Collins. Their only defeat came from Mexico. The champions got fine offensive performances from 1B Glenn Davis and OF George Bell, while the pitching staff was led by José Rijo, who posted three saves and did not allow an earned run in six innings of work, to earn Series MVP honors. Other contributions came from pitchers Tom Brennan (2-0, 1.59 ERA), Salomón Torres (a four-hit shutout) and Burt Hooton (1-0, seven SO). Also in the roster were Ralph Bryant, Braulio Castillo, Tony Fernández, David Green, Luis Pujols, Julio Solano and José Uribe.

Managed by catcher Francisco Estrada, Mexico finished in second place with a 3-3 mark. 2B Juan Navarrete hit .533 to win the batting title while 3B Nelson Barrera led the Series hitters with seven RBI. The Mexican team also featured players such as Derek Bryant, Lorenzo Bundy, Houston Jiménez, Chris Jones, Aurelio López, Sid Monge, Junior Moore and Vicente Romo.

Puerto Rico and Venezuela tied for third place with a 2-4 record.

The Puerto Rican team, with Mako Oliveras at the helm, was a huge favorite to win the Series, thanks to a roster loaded with prominent players like Juan Agosto, Luis Aguayo, Iván Calderón, Henry Cotto, Jesús Hernáiz, Carmelo Martínez, Edgar Martínez, José Oquendo, Luis Rosado, Orlando Sánchez, Benito Santiago, Candy Sierra and Rubén Sierra, but the team faded just after the first half. The team's only victories came behind strong pitching efforts from Francisco Oliveras and José Guzmán, who threw complete games against Mexico and Venezuela.

Aurelio Monteagudo managed the Venezuelan club, which was characterized by a fairly average pitching staff and really poor hitting. A modest contribution came from pitcher Bryan Clark (1-0, nine SO in seven innings) and infielders Pat Dodson (.429 SLG) and Luis Salazar (.474 SLG, five RBI). Other members of the team included Bob Fallon,  Ozzie Guillén, Gorman Heimueller, Luis Leal, Fred Manrique, Eddie Miller, Alfredo Pedrique, Gustavo Polidor and Argenis Salazar.

Scoreboards

Game 1, February 2

Game 2, February 2

Game 3, February 3

Game 4, February 3

Game 5, February 4

Game 6, February 4

Game 7, February 5

Game 8, February 5

Game 9, February 6

Game 10, February 6

Game 11, February 7

Game 12, February 7

See also
Ballplayers who have played in the Series

Sources
Antero Núñez, José. Series del Caribe. Impresos Urbina, Caracas, Venezuela.
Araujo Bojórquez, Alfonso. Series del Caribe: Narraciones y estadísticas, 1949-2001. Colegio de Bachilleres del Estado de Sinaloa, Mexico.
Figueredo, Jorge S. Cuban Baseball: A Statistical History, 1878 - 1961. Macfarland & Co., United States.
González Echevarría, Roberto. The Pride of Havana. Oxford University Express.
Gutiérrez, Daniel. Enciclopedia del Béisbol en Venezuela, Caracas, Venezuela.

External links
Official site
Latino Baseball
Series del Caribe, Las (Spanish)

 
 

Caribbean Series
Caribbean Series
International baseball competitions hosted by Mexico
Mazatlán
1985 in Mexican sports
1985 in Caribbean sport
Caribbean Series